Robert Pecl (born 15 November 1965) is a retired Austrian footballer

Club career
Between 1986 and 1995 he played club football for Rapid Wien and he captained the team in his final three seasons at the club. He had to end his career prematurely because of injury.

International career
He made his debut for Austria in October 1987 against Spain and was a participant at the 1990 FIFA World Cup, playing in all three games. He earned 31 caps, scoring one goal. His last international was a May 1993 World Cup qualification match against Sweden.

External links
Rapid stats - Rapid Archive

References

1965 births
Living people
Austrian footballers
Austria international footballers
1990 FIFA World Cup players
SK Rapid Wien players
Austrian Football Bundesliga players
Association football defenders
Footballers from Vienna
Austria under-21 international footballers